Nationality words link to articles with information on the nation's poetry or literature (for instance, Irish or France).

Events
 Hilda Doolittle meets and befriends Ezra Pound
 Times Literary Supplement begins publication

Works published in English

Canada
 James B. Dollard, also known as "Father Dollard", Irish Mist and Sunshine
 Anna Frances McCollum, Flower Legends and other Poems
 Agnes Ethelwyn Wetherald, Tangled in Stars

United Kingdom
 Alfred Austin, A Tale of True Love and Other Poems
 Maurice Baring, The Black Prince and Other Poems (published this year; book states "1903")
 Walter De la Mare (publishing under the pen name "Walter Ramal"), Songs of Childhood
 Thomas Hardy, Poems of the Past and Present actually published last year, although the book states "1902"
 Thomas MacDonagh, Through the Ivory Gate, Irish poet published in Ireland
 John Edward Masefield, Salt-Water Ballads, including "I must go down to the sea again"
 Alice Meynell, Later Poems
 Henry Newbolt, The Sailing of the Long Ships, and Other Poems
 Laurence Hope, editor, The Garden of Kama and Other Love Lyrics from India, London: Heinemann; anthology; Indian poetry in English, published in the United Kingdom
 Alfred Noyes, The Loom of Years
 Dora Sigerson, The Woman Who Went to Hell, and Other Ballads and Lyrics
 W.B. Yeats, Cathleen Ni Houlihan

United States
 Elizabeth Akers Allen, The Sunset Song
 Madison Cawein, Kentucky Poems
 John William De Forest, Poem: Medley and Palestrina
 Ellen Glasgow, The Freeman and Other Poems
 James Whitcomb Riley, The Book of Joyous Children
 Edwin Arlington Robinson, Captain Craig
 Trumbull Stickney, Dramatic Verses
 John B. Tabb, Later Lyrics

Other in English
 Adela Florence Cory Nicolson, editor, The Garden of Kama and Other Love Lyrics from India, London: Heinemann; anthology; Indian poetry in English, published in the United Kingdom

Works published in other languages
 Francis Jammes, France
 Chanda Jha, ; India, Maithili-language
 Else Lasker-Schüler, Styx, German
 Ștefan Petică, Romanian
 Rainer Maria Rilke, The Book of Images, German

Births
Death years link to the corresponding "[year] in poetry" article:
 January 10 – Dobriša Cesarić, Croatian poet and translator (d. 1980)
 February 1 – Langston Hughes (died 1967), African-American jazz poet, novelist, playwright, short story writer and newspaper columnist best known for his role in the Harlem Renaissance
 February 19 – Kay Boyle (died 1992, award-winning American poet, writer, educator and political activist
 February 22 – R. D. Fitzgerald (died 1987), Australian
 April 1 – Maria Polydouri (died 1930), Greek
 May 12 – Clementina Suárez (died 1991), Honduran
 July 3 – Yoshino Hideo  (died 1967), Japanese Shōwa period tanka poet
 July 19 – Ada Verdun Howell (died 1981), Australian
 July 28 – Kenneth Fearing (died 1961), American poet and writer
 August 19 – Ogden Nash (died 1971),  American poet best known for pithy and funny light verse.
 September 20 – Stevie Smith (died 1971),  British poet and novelist
 October 13 – Arna Bontemps (died 1973),  American poet and member of the Harlem Renaissance
 November 1 – Nordahl Grieg (killed in action 1943), Norwegian poet and author.
 November 8 – A. J. M. Smith (died 1980), Canadian poet.
 November 20 – Nazim Hikmet (died 1963), Turkish poet, dramatist and Communist
 December 6 – Michael Roberts (died 1948), English poet, writer, critic, broadcaster and teacher
 December 22 – Evelyn Eaton (died 1983), Canadian novelist, short-story writer, poet and academic
 Undated – Felipe Alfau (died 1999), Spanish-American poet, translator and author

Deaths
 January 20 – Aubrey Thomas De Vere, 88, Irish poet and critic
 April 1 – Thomas Dunn English (born 1819), American politician, poet, author, songwriter who was elected to the United States House of Representatives and had a feud with Edgar Allan Poe
 May 6 – Bret Harte, 66, American author and poet, best remembered for accounts of pioneering life in California
 June 29 – Brunton Stephens (born 1835), Australian
 September 6 – Philip James Bailey, 86, English poet
 September 19 – Masaoka Shiki , pen-name of  Masaoka Tsunenori , who changed his name to Noboru  (born 1867), Japanese author, poet, literary critic, journalist and, early in his life, a baseball player
 September 29 – William McGonagall, Scottish weaver, actor, and poet comically renowned as one of the worst poets in the English language
 October 4 – Lionel Pigot Johnson, 35 (born 1867), English poet, essayist, and critic

Awards and honors

See also

 20th century in poetry
 20th century in literature
 List of years in poetry
 List of years in literature
 French literature of the 20th century
 Silver Age of Russian Poetry
 Young Poland a modernist period in Polish arts and literature, roughly from 1890 to 1918
 Poetry

Notes

Poetry
20th-century poetry